Chay Saing Yun is a Cambodian politician. He belongs to the Cambodian People's Party and was elected to represent Kampot Province in the National Assembly of Cambodia in 2003.

References

Members of the National Assembly (Cambodia)
Cambodian People's Party politicians
Living people
Year of birth missing (living people)
Place of birth missing (living people)